Arthur Allan Seidelman is an American television, film, and theatre director and an occasional writer, producer, and actor.

Career
Born in New York City, he received his B.A. from Whittier College and an M.A. in Theatre from UCLA.  He subsequently studied with Sanford Meisner, who became a lifelong friend and mentor.  Seidelman made his screen directorial debut with Hercules in New York, a 1969 comedy-action film starring Arnold Schwarzenegger. Additional credits include The Caller, Walking Across Egypt, Puerto Vallarta Squeeze, The Sisters, The Awakening of Spring, and Children of Rage which was screened for major international bodies around the world, including the United States Senate Committee on Foreign Relations and the United Nations.  He has directed over fifty motion pictures and one hundred stage productions.  His most recent film is the 2014 adaptation of the play Six Dance Lessons in Six Weeks starring Gena Rowlands.

Most of Seidelman's career has been spent in television directing movies such as Macbeth, Like Mother Like Son: The Strange Story of Sante and Kenny Kimes, Poker Alice with Elizabeth Taylor, A Friendship in Vienna, Grace and Glorie, Harvest of Fire, Kate's Secret,  The Runaway, and A Christmas Carol-The Musical; episodes of series such as Fame, The Paper Chase, Knots Landing, Hill Street Blues, Magnum, P.I., Murder, She Wrote, Trapper John, M.D., L.A. Law, and A Year in the Life, among others; and several episodes of the ABC Afterschool Special series. The latter won him two Daytime Emmy Awards for Outstanding Individual Direction in 1979 and 1981. He received additional Emmy Award nominations for an episode of Hill Street Blues, the 1982 all-star variety special I Love Liberty, and as host of the PBS series Actors on Acting.  He also has won the Writers Guild of America Award for his contribution to I Love Liberty, featuring Barbra Streisand, Shirley MacLaine, Jane Fonda, Burt Lancaster, Martin Sheen, and Dionne Warwick, as well as two Christopher Awards. He has also won The Peabody Award, the Humanitas Prize, The Western Heritage Award, and numerous other awards from international film festivals, including the Milagro Award for the Best American Independent Film for The Sisters.  Seidelman guest starred in the final episode of ER. In 1987, he then entered into a non-exclusive association with Frank Yablans, where the duo is to produce feature films and television shows.

Seidelman directed Broadway productions of Billy (1969), a musical adaptation of Billy Budd;  Vieux Carré (1977) by Tennessee Williams; and Six Dance Lessons in Six Weeks (2003) by Richard Alfieri. He directed a revival of The Most Happy Fella for the New York City Opera in 1991. He has had considerable success off-Broadway with acclaimed productions of The Ceremony of Innocence, by Ronald Ribman, Awake and Sing by Clifford Odets and Hamp by John Wilson, among others.  He also directed Madama Butterfly for Opera Santa Barbara and The Gypsy Princess for Opera Pacific. In Los Angeles, he has directed major revivals of Hair, Of Thee I Sing, Mack and Mabel, The Boys from Syracuse, Follies, and others.  Also in Los Angeles he directed the first production of Six Dance Lessons in Six Weeks and The Sisters.  For regional theatres, he has directed Cat on a Hot Tin Roof, The Little Foxes, A Man for All Seasons, The Roar of the Greasepaint – The Smell of the Crowd, Romeo and Juliet, Stop the World – I Want to Get Off, and The Tempest, among others.   In addition, he served as the Administrator of the Forum Theatre (now the Mitzi E. Newhouse Theater) for the Repertory Theater of Lincoln Center for the Performing Arts and as Artistic Director of Theatre Vanguard in Los Angeles.

He has directed Richard Alfieri's Six Dance Lessons in Six Weeks in its Los Angeles premiere (with Uta Hagen and David Hyde Pierce) at the Geffen Playhouse and on Broadway (with Polly Bergen and Mark Hamill), in the West End (with Claire Bloom and Billy Zane), at the Coconut Grove Playhouse (with Rue McClanahan and Mark Hamill), and a Los Angeles revival (with Constance Towers and Jason Graae). The play has gone on to become one of the most-produced plays in the world with productions in 27 countries. Seidelman recently directed Alfieri's new play, Revolutions, at the Barter Theatre. He also directed Black Friday (also known as The Kidnapping), a film from 2007.

Personal life
While researching the film Children of Rage, he lived extensively in the Middle East, including in refugee camps in Lebanon, where at one point, he was taken hostage by extremists.

References

External links

Film directors from New York City
American theatre directors
American television directors
Emmy Award winners
Whittier College alumni
University of California, Los Angeles alumni
Writers Guild of America Award winners
Year of birth missing (living people)
Living people